Neutron scattering is a spectroscopic method of measuring the atomic and magnetic motions of atoms. Inelastic neutron scattering observes the change in the energy of the neutron as it scatters from a sample and can be used to probe a wide variety of different physical phenomena such as the motions of atoms (diffusional or hopping), the rotational modes of molecules, sound modes and molecular vibrations, recoil in quantum fluids, magnetic and quantum excitations or even electronic transitions. Since its discovery, neutron spectroscopy has also become useful in medicine as it has been applied to radiation protection and radiation therapy. Although neutron spectroscopy is capable of operating on many orders of magnitude of electron volts, current and recent research has focused on expanding neutron scattering to higher energy levels.

See also
Neutron diffraction
Raman scattering
Nested Neutron Spectrometer

References

External links
 - Neutron spectrometer on NASA's MESSENGER spacecraft.

Spectroscopy